Naomi Radcliffe (born 1971) is an English actress. She was born in Oldham, Lancashire to Albert Radcliffe—a Canon of Manchester Cathedral—and Petrina, a teacher. She was educated at The Blue Coat School in Oldham and the Royal Welsh College of Music and Drama, having not been accepted on her first attempt.

Her first professional stage appearance was in Be My Baby in 1997. Early television appearances include major roles in Kay Mellor's Band of Gold and Russell T Davies's The Grand, before she took the role of Alison Wakefield in the Granada Television soap opera Coronation Street. She remained on the soap for two years between 1998 and 2000. When her contract was not renewed, the character was written out in a scene that saw her commit suicide by jumping in front of a lorry. The scene, watched by 17 million viewers, won Radcliffe the British Soap Award for Best Exit. From 2002 to 2005, she played Jean Bradshaw in the BBC drama Born and Bred. In 2007 she played Bev in the BBC Three situation comedy The Visit.

Credits and awards

References

External links
Naomi Radcliffe at the British Film Institute

English soap opera actresses
Living people
Alumni of the Royal Welsh College of Music & Drama
1971 births
20th-century English actresses
21st-century English actresses
Actresses from Oldham
English stage actresses
English television actresses